Mostaganem Airport is a civilian airport in Mostaganem Province, Algeria , located about 280 km west-southwest of Algiers.   The airport has no commercial air service, and is sparsely used by general aviation.

World War II
During World War II, the facility was known as "Matemore Airfield".  It was a major Twelfth Air Force Troop Carrier transport base of operations during the North African Campaign against the German Afrika Korps.   It was used by the following combat units:

 4th Troop Carrier Squadron (62d Troop Carrier Group), 18 May-25 June 1943, C-47 Skytrain
 7th Troop Carrier Squadron (62d Troop Carrier Group), 21 May-22 June 1943, C-47 Skytrain
 8th Troop Carrier Squadron (62d Troop Carrier Group), 17 May-1 June 1943, C-47 Skytrain
 51st Troop Carrier Squadron (62d Troop Carrier Group), 16 May-2 July 1943, C-47 Skytrain

References 

 Maurer, Maurer. Air Force Combat Units of World War II. Maxwell AFB, Alabama: Office of Air Force History, 1983. .

External links
 Google Maps - Mostaganem
 OurAirports - Mostaganem
 

Airports in Algeria
Buildings and structures in Mostaganem Province
Airfields of the United States Army Air Forces in Algeria
World War II airfields in Algeria